Glenmuir is a famous golf knitwear and clothing company founded in 1891 in Lanark, Scotland. For the past 25 years it has been the Preferred Supplier of shirts and knitwear to the European Ryder Cup Team. Glenmuir's factory and factory shop are located 27-29 Delves Road, Lanark, Scotland ML11 9DX. Their factory shop is open from 10am to 4pm (Mon-Sat, closed on Sun).

History 
In 1891, local businessman Andrew MacDougall established a hosiery factory in the small village of Kirkfieldbank near Lanark, in the Clyde Valley. MacDougall’s first work force initially consisted of five women, all called Mary. MacDougall was the inventor of a new power-driven machine that greatly simplified the design and manufacture of fancy golf hose.

Before the turn of the century the company moved to a new factory on Delves Road in Lanark, which remains its headquarters to this day, and soon the premises were extended to accommodate the growing business. From its beginnings as a hosiery and knitwear factory, the company’s Lanark site has developed over the years to provide a club, corporate, and event embroidery programme.

The Ruia Group acquired Glenmuir in 2002. The Ruia Group, owners of Sock Shop  is a family run textile business based in Lancashire. In November 2009, an agreement between Glenmuir and Sunderland of Scotland meant Glenmuir became the official European distributor of Sunderland of Scotland golf products.

Glenmuir and the Ryder Cup 
Glenmuir's long-standing association with the Ryder Cup   began in 1987, when Tony Jacklin captained the first-ever European Team to lift the trophy on ‘foreign soil’ at Muirfield Village, USA.
Since that   15-13 victory the   partnership between Glenmuir and the European Ryder Cup committee has been one of the longest-running in the world of high-profile professional sport, with Glenmuir the Preferred Supplier of shirts and knitwear from 1987 to 2014.

Glenmuir and the Professional Golfer’s Association 
Glenmuir is the longest-running sponsor of the Glenmuir PGA Professional Championship, the largest annual competition for registered PGA Professionals, won in 2011 by Craig Goodfellow.

In 2010, Glenmuir also received a 25-year service recognition from Sandy Jones, Chief Executive of the PGA of GB&I.

Glenmuir is also a Corporate Partner of the PGAs of Europe and in 2011 was the Preferred Supplier to both teams in the Vivendi Seve Trophy.

External links 

 
 GolfBusinessNews.com story
 Ruia Group Corporate Website
 PGA Website
 PGA Website

Clothing companies of Scotland
Clothing companies of the United Kingdom
1891 establishments in the United Kingdom
Knitwear manufacturers
Scottish brands